The Utbi family (also spelled Otbi), was a Persian family which served the Samanid Empire. The first mentioned member of the family was Abu Ja'far Utbi, who served as the vizier of Nuh I (r. 943–954) and Mansur I (r. 961–976). Another member of the family was Abu'l-Husain Utbi, who served as the vizier of Nuh II (r. 976–997).

References

Sources